Darryl Mason Scott (born February 24, 1964) is an American politician. He was a Democratic member of the Delaware House of Representatives from 2009 to 2015, representing District 31. Scott earned a BS from Eastern Kentucky University.

Electoral history
In 2008, Scott won the general election with 4,372 votes (52.6%) against incumbent Republican Nancy Wagner, who had held the seat since 2001.
In 2010, Scott won the general election with 3,487 votes (59.1%) against Republican nominee Ronald Smith.
In 2012, Scott won the general election with 5,231 votes (62.6%) against Republican nominee Samuel Chick.

References

External links
Official page at the Delaware General Assembly
Campaign site
 

Place of birth missing (living people)
1964 births
Living people
Democratic Party members of the Delaware House of Representatives
Eastern Kentucky University alumni
People from Dover, Delaware